Leo Rich Lewis (11 February 1865 – 8 September 1945) was an American composer.  He graduated from Tufts College in Massachusetts in 1887 and later served as Fletcher Professor of Music and chairman of the music department there from 1892 to 1945.  He taught courses in music history and theory, as well as composition. He composed the Tufts College alma mater.

Among Lewis's notable students was Alan Hovhaness. He was also instrumental in securing the acceptance of the African American composer Jester Hairston to Tufts in 1927.

The Leo Rich Lewis Memorial Scholarship, established in 1950 by classmates, former students, family, and friends in his memory, is awarded each year to a Tufts University student, with preference given to students majoring in music.

References

External links
Letter to Leo Rich Lewis from Fred Waring

1865 births
1945 deaths
20th-century classical composers
American male classical composers
American classical composers
20th-century American composers
20th-century American male musicians